Ejnar Mikkelsen (December 23, 1880 – May 1, 1971) was a Danish polar explorer and writer. He is most known for his expeditions to Greenland.

Biography

Mikkelsen was born on December 23, 1880, in Vester Brønderslev, Jutland.

In 1900, he served in the Georg Carl Amdrup expedition to Christian IX Land in East Greenland. He then served in the Baldwin-Ziegler North Pole Expedition to Franz Joseph Land, which took place from 1900 to 1902.

With Ernest de Koven Leffingwell, he organized the Anglo-American polar expedition which wintered off Flaxman Island, Alaska, in 1906–07.

Mikkelsen organized an expedition to map the northeast coast of Greenland and to recover the bodies of the ill-fated Denmark expedition leader, Ludvig Mylius-Erichsen, and cartographer, Niels Peter Høeg Hagen, in addition to their records. For this task, Mikkelsen wintered from 1909 to 1910 at Shannon Island. His wooden ship, the Alabama, became trapped in the ice of Shannon Island and, while he was exploring, the rest of the party returned home on a whaler. Remaining with his engineer, Iver Iversen, Mikkelsen succeeded through a series of hazardous sledge journeys. They recovered the lost records in a cairn at the head of Danmark Fjord, discovering that "the Peary Channel does not exist."

Hence, he rebutted the existence of a hypothetical sound or marine channel running from east to west separating Peary Land in northernmost Greenland from the mainland further south.

The two explorers returned to Shannon Island to find the crew gone, but they used salvaged timbers and planking to erect a small cottage. Mikkelsen and Iversen then spent two winters at the cottage before they were rescued, in the direst of extremities, by a Norwegian whaler in the summer of 1912. The so-called Alabama cottage has survived and was photographed during a visit by Danish Navy inspection ship Ejnar Mikkelsen in September 2010.

In 1924, he led an expedition to settle what later came to be Scoresbysund. In 1932, he led the "Second East-Greenland Expedition of the Scoresbysund Committee" that carried out the first archaeological excavations on the Skaergaard intrusion by the shores of the Kangerlussuaq Fjord.

In 1970, on his 90th birthday, a national tribute was paid to him in Denmark; he died in Copenhagen a few months later on 1 May 1971. The Ejnar Mikkelsen Range is named after him.

Works
 Conquering the Arctic Ice (London, 1909)
 Lost in the Arctic (1913). Some of his Greenland expeditions are recounted here.
 Mylius-Erichsen's Report on the Non-Existence of Peary's Channel (1913)  
 Tre Aar par Grönlands Ostkyst (1914)  
 Nord-syd-øst-vest (1917)
 Norden For Lov og Ret, a story (1920)  
  translated as Frozen Justice (1922)  
 John Dale, a novel (1921)
 Farlig Tomansfaerd (1955)
 translated as Two Against the Ice, (1957)

Awards
 1933 Hans Egede Medal of the Royal Danish Geographical Society.
 1935 Patron's Medal of the Royal Geographical Society

In popular culture
The film Against the Ice, released on March 2, 2022, depicts Mikkelsen's most famous ordeal. He was portrayed by Nikolaj Coster-Waldau.

See also
Cartographic expeditions to Greenland
List of inspectors of Greenland

References

Further reading
 Meddelelser om Grønland (50 volumes, Copenhagen, 1876–1912)

External links

 

1880 births
1971 deaths
People from Brønderslev
Danish male novelists
Danish polar explorers
Explorers of the Arctic
Explorers of Alaska
Scandinavian explorers of North America
Greenlandic polar explorers
20th-century Danish novelists
20th-century Danish male writers